Viktória Kužmová was the defending champion, but chose not to participate.

Clara Tauson won the title, defeating Liu Fangzhou in the final, 6–4, 6–3.

Seeds

Draw

Finals

Top half

Bottom half

References

External Links
Main Draw

Pingshan Open - Singles
2019 Women's Singles